The 1954 World Table Tennis Championships women's doubles was the 20th edition of the women's doubles championship.
Diane Rowe and Rosalind Rowe defeated Ann Haydon-Jones and Kathleen Best in the final by three sets to one.

Results

See also
List of World Table Tennis Championships medalists

References

-
1954 in women's table tennis